The Very Best of Jump5 is a greatest hits compilation album by Christian pop group Jump5. It includes nine previous releases, including "Beauty and the Beast" which had previously only appeared on the first Disneymania album. It also contains three new songs, including a cover of Michael W. Smith's "Friends" from his album Change Your World. A limited edition version was also released, which included the "Jump5 Video Director" computer game. This was the last release by Jump5 while they were still signed to Sparrow Records. The Very Best of Jump5 charted at No. 30 upon the Billboard Top Christian Albums chart.

Track listing

 The versions of "Do Ya" and "Dance with Me" that appear here are slightly different than they appeared on their original releases.
The tracks "Don't Run Away", "Beautiful to Me" and their cover of Michael W. Smith's "Friends" were recorded for "Radio The World", an album that was never released.

{{Infobox video game
|title=Jump5 Video Director
|image=Jump5videodirector.jpg
|image_size=250px
|caption=Cover art of Jump5 Video Director
|developer=
|publisher=Sparrow Corporation
|director=
|producer=
|composer=
|series=
|platforms=Microsoft Windows
|released=November 2004
|genre=Simulation
|modes=Single-player
}}

 Jump5 Video Director Jump5 Video Director was a computer game released as a CD-ROM in November 2004. It was also included with copies of The Very Best of Jump5'' in 2005. The game allowed the player to create a live Jump5 performance by synchronizing choreography and selecting stage elements and camera angles.

References

Jump5 albums
2005 greatest hits albums
Sparrow Records compilation albums